Miriam García Iborra, Antonia Gómez Rodríguez and Desirée Hernández Folch, known as the Alcàsser Girls (Valencian: Les xiquetes d'Alcàsser, Spanish: Las niñas de Alcácer), were three teenage girls from Alcàsser, Valencia, Spain, who were kidnapped, raped, tortured and murdered after hitchhiking to visit a nightclub in the nearby town of Picassent on 13 November 1992. The case became notorious in Spain because of the brutality of the crimes, the highly-criticised police investigation and the resulting media coverage.

The autopsies revealed the existence of seven hairs with seven distinct DNA profiles, none of them belonging to any of the girls or either of their alleged murderers, Antonio Anglés and Miguel Ricart. Of the two, Ricart was the only one jailed; the whereabouts of Anglés, still among Interpol's most wanted criminals, remains unknown.

Disappearance
On 13 November 1992, Miriam García, Antonia 'Toñi' Gómez, and Desirée Hernández, all from the municipality of Alcàsser, sought to attend a secondary school party that was going to be held at Coolor, a popular discothèque located on the outskirts of Picassent, four kilometres away. Miriam asked her father, Fernando García, to pick them up and drive them to the club, but he was suffering from influenza and was unable to do so. The girls thus resorted to hitchhiking, as they had done the previous summer. A young couple from Alcàsser took the three girls to a petrol station near Picassent, where a resident witnessed them climb into a sedan  thought to be a white Opel Corsa  carrying a group of men. It was the last time the girls would be seen alive.

Crime scene reconstruction
Miguel Ricart is the only person charged regarding the event. According to Ricart's statement, he and Antonio Anglés picked up the girls at the petrol station. When the men drove past the nightclub and the girls began to scream, Anglés pistol-whipped them with a Star Model BM handgun. They headed to a crumbling abandoned house near a place known as La Romana, in a very isolated and mountainous area close to the Tous dam, where two of the girls were raped. Afterwards, they went to Catadau in search of some food, after which they raped the third girl two hours later. After being tortured for the remainder of the night, the girls were made to walk to a pit the men had previously dug and were assaulted further. According to the autopsy, Hernández suffered a traumatic amputation of the right nipple and areola with a sharp object, and was then stabbed twice in the back. The other girls were beaten with sticks and stones, before finally being shot and buried. García's corpse displayed vaginal wounds caused by an object provided with sharp edges, possibly produced postmortem. The killers picked up spent shell casings and cleaned their car.

Investigation
From the moment the girls were reported missing, an intensive search was conducted to try to find them. Their bodies were found on January 27, 1993, 75 days after their murders, by two beekeepers in a ditch located near La Romana ravine. Previous heavy rains softened the land, causing the corpses to appear from their improvised grave. It was soon confirmed that they had apparently been tortured and murdered. At the scene, the Spanish Civil Guard found one of Ricart's gloves, a Social Security referral note on behalf of Anglés' brother Enrique, and a shell casing. Spanish television channels quickly rushed to Alcàsser to cover the grief of the girls' families and the overwhelmed town.

Anglés was not at home when the Civil Guard appeared in search of Enrique, leading to a national manhunt. The last sighting of Anglés in Spain was near Minglanilla, Cuenca, after which he went to Lisbon, and stowed away on board the container ship City of Plymouth. He is assumed to have died when he reportedly jumped overboard off the coast of Ireland, either instantly or from subsequent cold and/or drowning. Alternative theories state that Anglés evaded capture and, as a native of Brazil, is traveling under his Brazilian passport.

Aftermath
Miguel Ricart was sentenced to 170 years in prison, but because at the time the maximum effective time a person could be in jail was 30 years, this was the maximum time he was expected to serve. Ricart was released from prison in 2013, after 21 years, following a ruling by the Court of Justice of the European Union that using the parot doctrine to disallow sentence reduction by good behaviour post conviction was against the principle that a prisoner's sentence cannot be increased retroactively.

Shortly after his release, he disappeared from the spotlight. After living for some time in the south of France, he resurfaced in Madrid in 2020 when he was identified by the police while trying to buy drugs in a squat.

The controversial trial of the two arrested suspects became a prime time showcase, featuring gruesome pictures of the teenagers' corpses, preceded by standard warnings to viewing audiences.

Books
Jenny Ashford – The Faceless Villain: Volume Three

Netflix documentary

Netflix released a five-part documentary series entitled The Alcàsser Murders in June 2019. There are several interviews included in it: , Fernando García, Jerónimo Boloix, Paco Lobatón, Neusa Martins and Luisa Gómez.

See also
 Aguilar de Campoo case
 List of fugitives from justice who disappeared
 List of solved missing person cases: pre-2000
 Marc Dutroux

References

External links
 "All the differents theories about this crime" ibb
 "The way from Alcàsser to La Romana" Flickr
 "Unresolved, The Alcasser Girls" Unresolved

1992 murders in Spain
1992 deaths
Female murder victims
Formerly missing people
Missing person cases in Spain
Spanish murder victims
Violence against women in Spain